RCN Nuestra Tele Internacional (previously known as TV Colombia and RCN Nuestra Tele) is an international pay television channel owned by Colombian television network RCN. It is a Spanish-language network aimed to Colombian and Latin American viewers around the world. It broadcasts television programs produced by RCN Televisión, most of them previously aired in this network in Colombia, and a few other shows from other companies, along with the Colombian First Football Division. It is broadcast in Australia and New Zealand via UBI World TV. DirecTV added the channel on 28 April 2010.

Until 2008, RCN Nuestra Tele also broadcast some programs from Citytv Bogotá.

Schedule 

Despite its coverage, which includes Oceania, RCN Nuestra Tele keeps a single feed, airing news bulletins, soccer games, several events and shows live. Therefore, prime time in Australia and New Zealand is filled with breakfast television including the RCN morning news show Muy buenos días.

References

External links
Official site

RCN Televisión
Spanish-language television stations
Television networks in Colombia
Television channels and stations established in 2003